Ubon Ratchathani railway station is a railway station located in Warin Chamrap Subdistrict, Warin Chamrap District, Ubon Ratchathani, It is a class 1 railway station located  from Bangkok railway station. The station opened in April 1, 1930 as part of the Northeastern Line Si Sa Ket–Ubon Ratchathani section.

In front of the station, there is a decommissioned 180 Unit NBL steam locomotive on display.

Train services 
As of January 2021, 22 trains serve Ubon Ratchathani railway station. The trains in number and class order are the following:

 Special Express 21/22 Krung Thep Aphiwat–Ubon Ratchathani–Krung Thep Aphiwat
 Special Express "Isan Wattana" 23/24 Krung Thep Aphiwat–Ubon Ratchathani–Krung Thep Aphiwat
 Express 67/68 Krung Thep Aphiwat–Ubon Ratchathani–Krung Thep Aphiwat
 Express 71/72 Krung Thep Aphiwat–Ubon Ratchathani–Krung Thep Aphiwat
 Rapid 135/136 Krung Thep Aphiwat–Ubon Ratchathani–Krung Thep Aphiwat
 Rapid 139/140 Krung Thep Aphiwat–Ubon Ratchathani–Krung Thep Aphiwat
 Rapid 141/142 Krung Thep Aphiwat–Ubon Ratchathani–Krung Thep Aphiwat
 Rapid 145/146 Krung Thep Aphiwat–Ubon Ratchathani–Krung Thep Aphiwat
 Local 419/420 Nakhon Ratchasima–Ubon Ratchathani–Lam Chi
 Local 421/422 Nakhon Ratchasima–Ubon Ratchathani–Lam Chi
 Local 425/426 Lam Chi–Ubon Ratchathani–Nakhon Ratchasima
 Local 427/428 Nakhon Ratchasima–Ubon Ratchathani–Nakhon Ratchasima

References 

Railway stations in Thailand